Rolv Berger Yttrehus (born Duluth, Minnesota, March 12, 1926 – February 4, 2018) was an American composer of contemporary classical music.

He held degrees from the University of Minnesota and University of Michigan and a Diploma from the Accademia di Santa Cecilia in Rome. He studied harmony with Nadia Boulanger and composition with Ross Lee Finney, Roger Sessions, Aaron Copland, and Goffredo Petrassi. He taught at the University of Missouri, Purdue University, University of Wisconsin, Oshkosh, and Rutgers University.

He regarded Arnold Schoenberg and Sessions as his principal influences.

He died in 2018.

List of works
Six Pieces for Piano Solo (1942–45)
Six Haiku (1960) pub. American Composers Alliance
Music for Winds, Percussion, and Viola (1961) pub. American Composers Alliance
Espressioni per Orchestra (1962) pub. American Composers Alliance
Sextet (1964–70, revised 1974) pub. C. F. Peters Corporation
Music for Winds, Percussion, 'Cello and Voices (1969) pub. Association for the Promotion of New Music (APNM)
Angstwagen (1971) pub. American Composers Alliance
Quintet (1973) pub. Boelke-Bomart/Mobart Music
Gradus ad Parnassum (1974–79) pub. American Composers Alliance
Sonata for Percussion and Piano (1982) pub. C. F. Peters Corporation
Explorations for Piano Solo (1985) pub. APNM
Sonata for 'Cello and Piano (1988, revised 1989) pub. C. F. Peters Corporation
Raritan Variations (1989) pub. APNM
Symphony No. 1 (1998) pub. APNM
Plectrum Spectrum (2000) pub. APNM
Sextet II (2006) pub. APNM
Laudate Milton Babbitt (2006) pub. APNM

References

Bibliography
Boros, James. 1988. "An Interview with Rolv Yttrehus on the Occasion of Gradus Ad Parnassum." Perspectives of New Music, 26/2 (Summer): 238–253
Boros, James. 1991. "The Role of Percussion Instruments in the Music of Rolv Yttrehus." Percussive Notes 30/2 (December): 63–68

External links
Interview with Rolv Yttrehus, February 2, 1991

University of Minnesota alumni
American male classical composers
American classical composers
20th-century classical composers
1926 births
Musicians from Duluth, Minnesota
Rutgers University faculty
2018 deaths
University of Michigan alumni
University of Missouri faculty
Purdue University faculty
University of Wisconsin–Oshkosh faculty
Writers from Duluth, Minnesota
Pupils of Roger Sessions
20th-century American composers
Classical musicians from Minnesota
20th-century American male musicians
21st-century classical composers
21st-century American composers
21st-century American male musicians